Maurice O'Corry was appointed the Dean of Armagh in 1380  and deprived in 1398.

References

Deans of Armagh
14th-century Irish Roman Catholic priests